Sovietskyi Raion is one of the 25 regions of Crimea, currently subject to a territorial dispute between the Russian Federation and Ukraine. The administrative center of the raion is the urban-type settlement of Sovietskyi. Population:

References

Raions of Crimea